Pablo Uberti (born 19 October 1997) is a French rugby union player, who plays for Union Bordeaux Bègles.

Club career 
Pablo Uberti started his career with US Tyrosse in 2015, playing in Fédérale 1 before moving to Union Bordeaux Bègles in 2017.

International career 
Pablo Uberti was first called to the France senior team in October 2022 for the Autumn internationals.

References

External link
ESPN profile

1997 births
Sportspeople from Bayonne
Living people
French rugby union players
Rugby union centres
Union Bordeaux Bègles players